The Light welterweight competition was the median weight class featured  at the 2009 World Amateur Boxing Championships, and was held at the Mediolanum Forum. Welterweights were limited to a maximum of 64 kilograms in body mass.

Medalists

Seeds

  Roniel Iglesias  (champion)
  Gyula Káté  (semifinals)
  Richarno Colin (first round)
  Uranchimegiin Mönkh-Erdene  (semifinals)
  Masatsugu Kawachi  (first round)
  Eduard Hambardzumyan  (second round)
  Alexis Vastine (third round)
  Driss Moussaid (third round)

Draw

Finals

Top Half

Section 1

Section 2

Bottom Half

Section 3

Section 4

See also
Boxing at the 2008 Summer Olympics – Light welterweight

External links
Draw

Light welterweight